Ethiopians in Italy are citizens and residents of Italy who are of Ethiopian descent. Many people of Ethiopian origin have become Italian citizens and are therefore no longer included in the demographic statistics.

History

Ethiopian pilgrims have been recorded in Rome since the early 15th century. By the early 16th century, the Ethiopian community was well-established in Rome, centered on the church of Santo Stefano degli Abissini.

Ethiopians in Italy were 7,772 in 2016, up from 6,656 in 2007. While the historical presence is linked to the training of priests at the Ethiopian College, contemporary Ethiopian immigration is rather feminized and linked to the domestic work market. It is a contained and constant migratory flow.

Asylum requests in Italy by Ethiopian citizens remain limited compared to the total (2,155 in 2015). Of these, 85% obtained a residence permit for international or humanitarian protection. Italy is also a crossing point for Ethiopian refugees headed to Northern Europe (United Kingdom and Sweden). Often, due to the Dublin Regulations, such asylum seekers are then sent back to Italy. 

In Rome the Ethiopian community (as well as the Eritrean one) is concentrated in the Termini station area: via Milazzo and via dei Mille, via Volturno and via Montebello.

Demographics
As of 2021, most Ethiopian nationals residing in Italy live in Rome, Milan, Parma, and Turin. The following table lists Italian provinces by Ethiopian population.

Notable people

 Saba Anglana, singer
 Dagmawi Yimer, filmmaker
 Yohanes Chiappinelli, runner and steeplechaser
Yemaneberhan Crippa, runner
Gabriella Ghermandi, writer and performer 
Aida Girma-Melaku, writer and  UNICEF representative in Pakistan
Agitu Ideo Gudeta, entrepreneur and environmentalist
Mel Taufer, football player
Eyob Zambataro, football player

Associations
 Association of the Ethiopian community in Rome

References

Ethiopian diaspora in Italy
African diaspora in Italy
History of Ethiopia
Ethnic groups in Italy